The Bluegrass Conference is a high school sports league in Iowa. Located in South-central Iowa, the conference is home to some of the smallest schools in the state, including three of the smallest public schools in Iowa (Orient-Macksburg, Diagonal, and Moulton-Udell).

Members

History
The conference originated before 1960. Some of the members in the early days included Osceola, Bedford, Mount Ayr, Lamoni, Seymour, Corydon, and Leon. Lenox and Mormon Trail of Humeston joined the conference in 1960, as Osceola departed. In 1962, four schools left the conference to join the newly formed Tall Corn Conference.  This left the conference with Lamoni, Leon, Mormon Trail, Corydon, Seymour, and Moravia. As the years went by, some schools changed names and Southeast Warren and Melcher-Dallas joined the conference, so that by 1990 the conference looked like this:

Lamoni
Melcher-Dallas
Moravia
Mormon Trail
Wayne
S.E. Warren
Central Decatur (of Leon)
Seymour

After losing some of the bigger schools to other conferences, the Bluegrass reached out to many of the smaller schools in the area. These new schools were some of the smallest in the state. The Bluegrass Conference operated with 12 teams for a while, but with three schools having been shut down in recent years, the conference is now left with just nine schools. In 2002, Fox Valley Community School in Milton closed its doors, after the district voted to shut down the school and allow the pupils to open enroll where they wished. The next casualty came in 2008, when Russell became the first public school to be shut down by the state in over a decade. East Monona had been the most recent. Then, in 2010, Lineville-Clio was closed by the state. Currently, the conference hosts four of the six smallest public schools in the state, with Diagonal (26 BEDs), Orient-Macksburg (35), Moulton-Udell (38), and Mormon Trail (45). Not all conference schools are in as bad of shape when it comes to enrollment numbers, but all schools are easily in the 1A classification (the smallest classification for schools in Iowa).

Starting in the 2013-14 academic year, the following schools joined the conference:
 Ankeny Christian Academy (Ankeny)
 Grand View Christian School (Des Moines)
 Iowa Christian Academy (West Des Moines)
 Orient-Macksburg

Despite the enrollment figures, all schools but Diagonal and Orient-Macksburg play football, fielding 8-man teams. Before Russell and Fox Valley shut down, they also played 8-man football. Most of the schools also field teams in baseball, softball, volleyball, basketball, and track and field.

Iowa Christian Academy officials announced on November 28, 2018, that the school would close. Students were encouraged to attend Grandview Christian School.

References

External links
Official website

High school sports in Iowa